There are a number of special routes of U.S. Route 2 (US 2). These special routes connect US 2 to downtown areas, bypass city centers, or provide alternate routes around an area.

Cashmere business route

Williston business loop

U.S. Highway 2 Business (US 2 Bus.) in Williston, North Dakota, is a route that goes into the downtown area of Williston. This was formerly also signed as US 85 Bus.

Minot business loop

U.S. Highway 2 Business (US 2 Bus.) in Minot, North Dakota, begins at US 2 and US 52. US 2 is a bypass of the downtown area while US 2 Bus. goes through the downtown area. It intersects US 83 and a connector leading to US 52 before returning to US 2 east of downtown Minot.

Minot bypass route

Grand Forks–East Grand Forks business loop

U.S. Highway 2 Business (US 2 Bus.) begins at US 2 in North Dakota near US 2's intersection with US 81 Bus. US 2 Bus. continues to the southeast, passing through the town square of Grand Forks, North Dakota, and intersecting North Dakota Highway 297 (ND 297). US 2 Bus. then enters Minnesota before terminating at US 2 in East Grand Forks.

Superior truck route

Truck U.S. Highway 2 (Truck US 2) is a  truck route used to divert heavy truck traffic out of downtown Superior, Wisconsin. It begins at a roundabout on US 2 and follows local streets bypassing downtown Superior to the north before meeting US 53 at an intersection. It runs concurrently with US 53 until the route meets back up with US 2.

Major intersections

Ashland alternate route

Alternate U.S. Highway 2 (Alt. US 2) in Ashland, Wisconsin, is an alternate route of US 2. Alt. US 2 begins at US 2 west of Ashland at the western terminus of State Trunk Highway 137 (WIS 137), heading west along WIS 137, as well as WIS 13A, in a concurrency. After passing the intersection with Lindblad Road, Alt. US 2/WIS 13A/WIS 137 gains the name Gold Course Road, traveling west until the intersection with Sanborn Avenue in Ashland, where WIS 137 ends its concurrency at its eastern terminus. Alt. US 2/WIS 13A continue north along Sanborn Avenue/WIS 112, where Alt. US 2 ends at US 2.

Ironwood business spur

Business US Highway 2 (Bus. US 2) is a  business route running through Ironwood, Michigan, to the Wisconsin state line on the Montreal River. The western terminus of Bus. US 2 is at the Wisconsin state line between Hurley, Wisconsin, and Ironwood on Silver Street. The eastern terminus is at the intersection with US 2 at the corner of Cloverland Drive and Douglas Street north of downtown.

The business route was created in August 1942 when former M‑54 in Ironwood was renumbered as a business loop of US 2. It was originally a bistate business connection before the Wisconsin Department of Transportation decommissioned Bus. US 2 in Hurley westward along State Trunk Highway 77 and northward along US 51 in 2002.

Montpelier business loop

U.S. Route 2 Business (US 2 Bus.) is a  business route of US 2 located in Montpelier, Vermont. The route is coextensive with State Street and the lower half of Main Street. The road begins when US 2 turns right to bypass downtown Montpelier. By following US 2 Bus., one will pass by the majority of the state offices, including the Vermont State House. However, this road is barely signed as being "US 2 Bus." and is even less referred to as such.

St. Johnsbury truck route

U.S. Route 2 Truck (US 2 Truck) is a  truck route used to divert heavy truck traffic around the town of St. Johnsbury, Vermont. It begins at an interchange with I-91 and US 2 in St. Johnsbury. It travels to the south-southeast, running concurrently with I-91, in the southern part of the city. The two routes have an interchange with US 5. Then, they cross over the Passumpsic River and leave the city limits of St. Johnsbury. They reach an interchange with I-93. At this interchange, US 2 Truck ends its concurrency with I-91 and begins one with I-93 to the northeast. I-93/US 2 Truck travel concurrently for one exit, an interchange with Vermont Route 18 (VT 18). At this interchange, US 2 Truck ends its concurrency with I-93 and begins a brief one with VT 18. The two highways have an intersection with US 2 on the northeastern edge of the city limits of St. Johnsbury. At this intersection, both US 2 Truck and VT 18 terminate.

Navigating a semitrailer truck through downtown St. Johnsbury via US 2 is tricky at best and dangerous at worst, with several sharp turns on narrow, downtown streets with one very steep grade involved on Eastern Avenue. The truck route was designated in an attempt to alleviate the truck traffic in the congested downtown area, which includes the campus of St. Johnsbury Academy, a private secondary school. St. Johnsbury officials still hope to persuade the state to increase weight limits on Interstates in an effort to keep 18-wheelers away from St. Johnsbury Academy. Selectmen contend heavy trucks passing through the Academy campus present a danger to students, and a nuisance for drivers.

This posed a problem for local trucks loaded with logs and wood chips. Their weight typically exceeds Interstate limits but is still within the limits for state and U.S. highways. This created a situation where the most dangerous and difficult-to-handle trucks were forced to use the main US 2 route through downtown St. Johnsbury. Signs at the junctions of US 2 Truck and US 2 warned commercial drivers that the weight limits were limited to those on the Interstate Highway System. Federal legislation authored by U.S. Senator Patrick Leahy (D-VT) included Vermont in a pilot program to allow Interstate weight limits to be increased for a period of one year, with evaluation of the program to follow. Vermont's state legislature quickly authored a measure to allow the heavier limits, which was signed into law by the governor on January 13, 2010.

Major intersections

Orono–Old Town alternate route

U.S. Route 2A (US 2A), also known as U.S. Route 2 Alternate (US 2 Alt.), in Orono and Old Town, Maine, is a  alternate route of US 2, which connects it to the University of Maine. At its southern terminus near downtown Orono, the route splits from US 2 to follow College Avenue, then turns onto Stillwater Avenue to reach Old Town. The northern terminus is at the intersection of Center Street (US 2A) and Main Street (US 2) in downtown Old Town, where US 2A rejoins US 2 to cross the Penobscot River into Milford, while Main Street continues north in Old Town as State Route 43.

Aroostook County alternate route

U.S. Route 2A (US 2A), also known as U.S. Route 2 Alternate (US 2 Alt.), is a  alternate route that runs from US 2 in Macwahoc Plantation, Maine, to US 2 and US 1 in Houlton.

Unlike US 2, which runs north from Macwahoc Plantation and parallels Interstate 95 (I-95) from Sherman to Houlton, US 2A veers to the south and east to serve an isolated area of the state. It is also the Haynesville Woods road made famous by country music singer Dick Curless in his song "A Tombstone Every Mile".

References

External links
 Business US 2 at State-ends.com

02
U.S. Route 2
Transportation in Penobscot County, Maine
U.S. Highways in North Dakota
U.S. Highways in Vermont
U.S. Highways in Maine
Transportation in Aroostook County, Maine